is a town located in Kitashitara District, Aichi Prefecture, Japan. , the town had an estimated population of 4,531 in 2,133 households, and a population density of 16.5 persons per km².

Geography
Shitara is located in the extreme northeast corner of Aichi Prefecture. Much of the town’s area is covered by mountains and forest, and portions of the town are within the borders of the Tenryū-Okumikawa Quasi-National Park.

Neighboring municipalities
Aichi Prefecture
Shinshiro
Toyota
 Kitashitara District
Toyone 
Toei 
Nagano Prefecture
Shimoina District
 Neba

Demographics
Per Japanese census data, the population of Shitara has decreased drastically and is only a third of what it was 60 years ago.

Climate
The town has a climate characterized by hot and humid summers, and relatively mild winters (Köppen climate classification Cfa).  The average annual temperature in Shitara is 11.9 °C. The average annual rainfall is 2310 mm with September as the wettest month. The temperatures are highest on average in August, at around 23.6 °C, and lowest in January, at around 0.3 °C.

History
During the Edo period, most of present Shitara was tenryō territory under direct control of the Tokugawa shogunate.  After the Meiji Restoration, the area was organized into several villages within Kitashitara District with the establishment of the modern municipalities system. Taguchi Village, the site of the district administrative office, was elevated to town status on October 10, 1900. The town of Shitara was established on September 30, 1956 through the merger of Taguchi with the neighboring villages of Damine, Nagura and Furikusa. The village of Tsugu was also formed on the same day through the merger of Kamitsugu and Shimotsugu villages. Shitara and Tsugu merged on October 1, 2005.

Economy
The primary industry of Shitara is agriculture, with rice, tomatoes, cabbage and daikon as the main crops. Production of hydroelectric power generation is also a major contributor to the local economy.

Education
Shitara has five public elementary schools and two public junior high schools operated by the city government, and one public high school operated by the Aichi Prefectural Board of Education.

Primary schools
Taguchi Primary School
Seirei Primary School
Damine Primary School
Nagura Primary School
Tsugu Primary School

Junior High schools
Shitara Junior High School
Tsugu Junior High School

High schools
Taguchi High School

Foreign Exchange Program
Thomas Middle School (Arlington Heights, IL, USA)
South Middle School (Arlington Heights, IL, USA)

Transportation

Railway
Shitara does not have any passenger railway services.

Highway

Local attractions
Kurabune Ruins (鞍船遺跡) – Jōmon period archaeological site excavated in 1922
Damine Castle (田峯城) – ruins of a Sengoku period castle
Soezawa Onsen - hot spring resort

Notable people from Shitara
Mitsuzo Sasaki, author

References

External links

Official home page

 
Towns in Aichi Prefecture